Confessions of a Blues Singer is a blues album by Rory Block. It was released in 1998 through Rounder Records.

Critical reception
The Chicago Tribune wrote that "the album doesn't rise above its museum-piece feeling until Block closes with two epic originals, 'Mother Marian', a sad profile of an elderly acquaintance, and the autobiographical 'Life Song'."

Track listing
 "If I Had Possession Over Judgement Day" (Johnson) - 3:05
 "Ramblin' on My Mind" (Johnson) - 3:18
 "Kassie Jones" (Lewis) - 4:19
 "I Am in the Heavenly Way" (White) - 3:09
 "Statesboro Blues" (McTell) - 2:39
 "Long Way from Home" (Johnson) - 3:27
 "Bo Weavil Blues" (Patton) - 3:36
 "I'll Go with Him" (Wilkins ) - 2:57
 "Titanic (When That Great Ship went Down)" (Smith, Smith) - 2:12
 "Silver Slide Moan" (Block) - 0:37
 "Mother Marian" (Block) - 8:55
 "Life Song" (Block) - 9:11

References

1998 albums
Blues albums by American artists
Rory Block albums
Rounder Records albums